The Pacific Northwest Amateur is an annual amateur golf tournament. It is one of the oldest amateur tournaments in the United States having first been played in 1899. It is organized by the Pacific Northwest Golf Association (PNGA) and the tournament is also known as the PNGA Men's Amateur. It is played at a variety of courses in the Pacific Northwest.

Winners

2022 Paul Mitzel
2021 Alfred Raja
2020 Canceled
2019 Laurent Desmarchais
2018 Mitchell Baldridge
2017 Emmett Oh
2016 Yuan Yechun
2015 Anthony Quayle
2014 James Beale
2013 Cameron Peck
2012 Shotaro Ban
2011 Zac Blair
2010 Brett Drewitt
2009 Tyler Matthews
2008 Jason Kang
2007 Jake Younan-Wise
2006 Danny Green
2005 Jordan Madison
2004 David Fern
2003 Nick Flanagan
2002 Brady Stockton
2001 Jason Hartwick
2000 Jeff Quinney
1999 Michael Beard
1998 Jeff Quinney
1997 Ben Crane
1996 Joel Kribel
1995 Birk Nelson
1994 Tiger Woods
1993 Chris Jorgensen
1992 Scott Bennett
1991 Craig Kanada
1990 Warren Vickers
1989 Todd Kernaghan
1988 Mike Swingle
1987 Scott Sullivan
1986 Jim Strickland
1985 Mike Hegarty
1984 Jeff Ellis
1983 Dave DeLong
1982 Eric Johnson
1981 Rick Fehr
1980 Brian Haugen
1979 Mark Wiebe
1978 Scott Tuttle
1977 Jeff Coston
1976 Bill Sander
1975 Bob Mitchell
1974 Ed Jonson
1973 Dave Mick
1972 Jim McLean
1971 Jim McLean
1970 Pat Welch
1969 Jim McLean
1968 Allen Brooks
1967 Donny Power
1966 Elwin Fanning
1965 George Holland
1964 Mickey Shaw
1963 Ken Storey
1962 Kermit Zarley
1961 Harry Givan
1960 Ron Willey
1959 Ron Willey
1958 George Holland
1957 Bill Warner
1956 Bob Kidd
1955 Dick Yost
1954 Bob Fleming
1953 Dick Yost
1952 Bill Mawhinney
1951 Jack Westland
1950 Al Mengert
1949 Bruce McCormick
1948 Glen Sherriff
1947 Ray Weston
1946 Harry Givan
1945 Harry Givan
1942–44 No tournament
1941 Bud Ward
1940 Jack Westland
1939 Jack Westland
1938 Jack Westland
1937 Harry Givan
1936 Harry Givan
1935 Albert Campbell
1934 Kenneth Storey
1933 Albert Campbell
1932 Chandler Egan
1931 Frank Dolp
1930 Eddie Hogan
1929 Frank Dolp
1928 Oscar Willing
1927 Rudolph Wilhelm
1926 Forest Watson
1925 Chandler Egan
1924 Oscar Willing
1923 Chandler Egan
1922 George Von Elm
1921 George Von Elm
1920 Chandler Egan
1919 Clare Griswold
1918 H. A. Fleager
1917 Rudolph Wilhelm
1916 S. R. Smith
1915 Chandler Egan
1914 Jack Neville
1913 A. V. Macan
1912 R. N. Kincks
1911 W. B. Mixter
1910 R. L. MacLeay
1909 Douglas Grant
1908 George Ladd Munn
1907 T. S. Lippy
1906 C.K. Magill
1905 R. L. MacLeay
1904 R. L. MacLeay
1903 R. L. MacLeay
1902 F. C. Newton
1901 A. H. Goldfinch
1900 P. B. Gifford
1899 Charles H. Mallott

References

External links
Pacific Northwest Golf Association
List of winners

Amateur golf tournaments in the United States
Amateur golf tournaments in Canada
Recurring sporting events established in 1899
1899 establishments in the United States